The Chrysler 300 (Chrysler 300 Sport Series) was a full-size automobile produced by Chrysler from 1962 until 1971.  It was a continuation of the earlier Chrysler 300 letter series. Chrysler decided to consolidate its product line and the sedan replaced the 1961 Chrysler Windsor, which itself filled the place in Chrysler's line previously occupied by the Saratoga just the year before that (1960) and also filled in for the discontinued DeSoto product line. At the time, it was considered a luxurious "muscle car", with all the performance of the Dodge and Plymouth products of the time, but with the luxury features expected of the Chrysler name.

The 300 was positioned as a more affordable version of the exclusive 300 "letter series", and a sporty variant of a full-size automobile, adding 4-door hardtop version and running alongside that model until its discontinuation in 1966. It became the sole 300 model until 1971, when production ended. The 300 name returned to the Chrysler line in 1979 as an option package on the Cordoba coupe.

1962–1964 

The Sport Series was introduced in 1962 along with the letter series 300H when DeSoto was cancelled. The Sport Series was the hardtop coupe, sedan and convertible and had only bench seats installed for all passengers, while the letter series was the coupe and had only bucket seats for all passengers and a full length center console.   

Chrysler expanded the 300 product line to include a 4-door hardtop, which was a previous appearance on the 1960 DeSoto Adventurer hardtop sedan, adding 383 V8 as a choice (letter cars had 413 V8 as standard).

For Canadian market there was similar Chrysler Saratoga offered instead, also as a 4-door sedan, from 1964 named Chrysler Saratoga 300 and bearing a similar trim.

1963 saw all-new sheet metal and the canted headlights were no longer offered.

1965–1968 

There was an all-new sheetmetal in 1965.  When the performance-first the Chrysler 300 letter series was discontinued in 1966, the 440 V8 replaced the 413 V8 in this "non-letter" version, and there was a mild facelift.

1967 brought makeovers which changed front and rear styling extensively.  The 4-door sedan was dropped from lineup (leaving the 4-door hardtop, 2-door hardtop, and 2-door convertible), the 440 V8 remained  and only available powerplant in two guises: base and more powerful TNT. 1968 face-lifting brought concealed headlamps which were to be 300 trademark until 1971.

1969–1971 

1969 was first year for "fuselage styling", there were two engine options; 440 and 440 TNT.

For 1970, taking a cue from Oldsmobile, a Hurst 300 was offered in Spinnaker White trimmed in Satin Tan with leather interior (borrowed from the Imperial), powered by a   TNT V8, as a limited edition of 485. The single convertible built used a standard Chrysler 300 white interior.

In 1971, the convertible was no longer offered, as Chrysler halted production of convertibles across the entire lineup in 1971.

Engines

1979 

The 300 name returned to the Chrysler line in the spring of 1979; this time based on the Cordoba coupe. The 300 was a $2,040 option package featuring special emblems and traditional "cross-hair" 300-style grille. It was available in Spinnaker White (perhaps 30 were painted Rallye Red) with a red-leather interior and red pin stripes. The model came with the code E58   V8, featuring a four-barrel carburetor, a performance camshaft, and dual exhausts. 

Other features included police-spec suspension with 15"x7" wheels, heavy duty torsion bars/leaf springs/shocks, front and rear sway bars, and a 3.23 rear gear ratio. The deteriorating U.S. domestic economic conditions that led to the early 1980s recession reflected in low demand and less than 2,900 were built. The 300 model was planned for the 1980 model year using the new 2nd-generation Cordoba (based on the downsized Chrysler J platform), but was instead called the "LS".

Notes

External links 

 Website covering all generations of Chrysler 300 vehicles from 1955 to 2007

300
Rear-wheel-drive vehicles
Full-size vehicles
Convertibles
Coupés
Sedans
1960s cars
1970s cars